William John Maxwell was a United States Navy officer who served as the 18th Naval Governor of Guam. He entered the United States Naval Academy in 1874, but was not commissioned as an ensign until 1883. He served aboard many ships before becoming one of the inaugural members of the General Board of the United States Navy.

After becoming governor in 1914, Maxwell instituted a number of reforms, including establishing the Bank of Guam and the Guam Insular Patrol Force. He also reorganized the tax system and stressed the building and improvement of new roads. His plans to give Guamanians United States citizenship was rejected by then-Assistant Secretary of the Navy Franklin Delano Roosevelt. Guam became the center an international relations incident when the German  made port there asking for coal at a time when the United States remained neutral in World War I. Maxwell refused to break neutrality by providing fuel and supplies, forcing the ship to stay in port for the next two years. Maxwell attracted controversy during his term, particularly when he approved the first execution on the island since the US takeover. Eventually, a lower-ranking officer, William P. Cronan, placed Maxwell on the sick list, despite his protest, and removed him from power, taking the office himself. The Navy launched an inquiry into the appropriateness and motives of the dismissal, but nonetheless, Maxwell, declared perfectly healthy by mainland doctors, was reassigned to the Naval War College.

Naval career
Maxwell was appointed to the United States Naval Academy on June 8, 1874. On March 3, 1883, he was commissioned as an ensign junior grade, and an ensign on June 26, 1884. He served aboard the training ship  from 1883 to 1885. On July 4, 1893, he was promoted to Lieutenant (junior grade).

In 1900, Maxwell began his assignment aboard . In 1905, as a Lieutenant Commander, he served as Chief Engineer on 's commissioning crew. In 1910 as a Commander, he served as one of the first members of the General Board of the United States Navy. On November 12, 1911, he left Hampton Roads, Virginia commanding , after being placed in command two days before. He continued in this position until 1912. In 1913, he commanded .

Governorship
Maxwell served as Naval Governor of Guam from March 28, 1914 to April 29, 1916. During his term, a typhoon hit in the summer of 1914, leaving a shortage of rice and corn crops. As governor, he established a number of government organizations, some still in existence. These organizations include the Guam Insular Patrol Force, the civilian predecessor to the Guam Police Department, as well as the Bank of Guam. He reorganized the taxation system by raising property assessments and stressed road building. The bank opened in January 1916 and helped many islanders obtain loans to open small businesses. He also served as the first chairman of the Guamanian chapter of the American Red Cross and organized its first fundraising drive. In 1914, Maxwell proposed granting United States citizenship to the people of Guam. However, Franklin Delano Roosevelt, then Assistant Secretary of the Navy, rejected the plan, claiming that making Guamanians citizens was not in the best interest of the country. He also asked that Guam be made an open port of trade to all ships, believing this would reduce the local's dependence on government assistance for food.

In December 1914, Maxwell found himself at the center of a diplomatic incident when the German Empire ship  stopped in Guam to resupply on coal. Maxwell, under orders to maintain American neutrality in the recently begun World War I, refused the ship supplies, instead forcing it to voluntarily inter itself at the island for the next two years.

Near the end of his term, Maxwell began coming into conflict with the islanders. He attracted some controversy when he outlawed public whistling, hoping to curtail mischievous local boys from whistling an incorrect cadence as sailors marched. He attracted larger anger when he ordered the first execution on the island since the United States had assumed control of it; despite numerous pleas to commute the sentence to life imprisonment, the man, Filipino Pablo Corpus, was executed for murder on February 4, 1916 by hanging. On April 29, 1916, William P. Cronan relieved Maxwell after involuntarily placing him on the sick list. However, upon transportation to the mainland United States, he was found to be perfectly healthy and reassigned to the Naval War College. The Navy launched an inquiry, led by Captain William R. Shoemaker, into the events surrounding Maxwell's dismissal and placement on the list by an officer of a lower rank. It was alleged that Cronan, then aide to the governor, disagreed with several of Maxwell's policies and used improper and unprofessional methods to oust him and take the position for himself.

Legacy
The Maxwell School, named after the governor, was built in Santa Rita, Guam in the early 1930s, but does not exist today.

References

Governors of Guam
United States Naval Academy alumni
Navy Midshipmen football players
American Red Cross personnel
United States Navy personnel of World War I
Naval War College faculty
Year of birth missing
Year of death missing